Lau Chi Lok (born 15 October 1993) is a Hong Kong professional footballer who currently plays as a forward for Hong Kong Premier League club Rangers.

References

External links
 HKFA

1993 births
Living people
Hong Kong footballers
Association football midfielders
Yuen Long FC players
Southern District FC players
Hong Kong Rangers FC players
Dreams Sports Club players
TSW Pegasus FC players
Hong Kong Premier League players
Hong Kong First Division League players